

J
 JAIL - Jackson and Lansing Railroad
 JAAU - Jordan Bromine Company
 JACX - Johnstown America Corporation
 JAIX - JAIX Leasing Corporation
 JALX - JAIX Leasing Corporation
 JANX - JAN, Inc.
 JBHU - J.B. Hunt Transport, Inc.
 JBHZ - J.B. Hunt Transport, Inc.
 JBIX - Tank Car Services, Inc.
 JBPX - PacifiCorp Electric Operations and Idaho Power Company (Jim Bridger Project)
 JBRX - Bakery Trading Company
 JBTU - Jumbotainer BV Barendecht
 JCDX - Jefferson County Drainage District No. 6
 JCEX - John S. Carlson and Company, Inc.
 JCIX - Jones Chemicals, Inc.
 JCLX - Mid-Am Equipment, Inc.
 JCMX - James C. McCanless
 JCSX - Sawyer Gas of Jacksonville, Inc., Heritage Operating, LP
 JDIX - Jim Dobbas, Inc.
 JDMX - Joseph Transportation, Inc.
 JDSX - M and C Railcar Leasing, LLC
 JE   - Jerseyville and Eastern, Joppa and Eastern Railroad
 JECX - Western Resources, Inc.
 JEFW - Jefferson Warrior Railroad
 JEPX - PSI Energy, Inc.
 JFDX - W. K. Horney
 JGLU - Juglinija Lines
 JGRU - John G. Russell Transport, Ltd.
 JGS  - James Griffiths and Sons
 JHMX - Alabama Power Company
 JHPX - Huntsman Chemical Corporation, NOVA Chemicals
 JJJX - JJ Railcar Leasing, Ltd.
 JJRD - J and J Railroad
 JKBX - John Kenneth Burbridge
 JKL  - J.K. Line, Inc.
 JKWI - Johnsonburg, Kane, Warren and Irvine Railroad
 JLAU - Japan Line, Ltd.
 JLDU - Japan Line, Ltd.
 JLEU - Japan Line, Ltd.
 JLEZ - Japan Line, Ltd.
 JLHU - Japan Line, Ltd.
 JLLU - Japan Line, Ltd.
 JLLX - LaRoche Industries, Inc.
 JLLZ - Japan Line, Ltd.
 JLMU - Japan Line, Ltd.
 JLMX - John L. McCarthy
 JLPU - Japan Line, Ltd.
 JLSU - Japan Line, Ltd.
 JLSZ - Japan Line, Ltd.
 JLTU - Japan Line, Ltd.
 JMHX - J. M. Huber Corporation
 JMJZ - J.M.J. Projects, Inc.
 JNSX - JNS Marketing Company (Coastline Rail Service Division)
 JNTX - John Neas Tank Lines
 JOBX - Tealinc, Ltd.
 JORX - Jormac, SA de CV
 JOSX - David J. Joseph Transportation, Inc.
 JOTU - Japan Oil Transportation Company, Ltd.
 JPBX - Peninsula Corridor Joint Powers Board (Caltrain)
 JPTU - Daikin Industries
 JRCX - GLNX Corporation
 JRSX - J. R. Simplot Company
 JRWX - Johnson Railway Service, Inc.
 JSCU - Flexi-Van Leasing, Inc.
 JSCZ - Flexi-Van Leasing, Inc.
 JSRC - Jackson and Southern Railroad
 JSRW - Jersey Southern Railway
 JSSU - China Navigation Company, Ltd.
 JSSX - Jersey Shore Steel Company
 JTAX - Trinity Rail Management, Inc.
 JTCO - Jacksonville Terminal Company
 JTFX - Joseph Leasing, Ltd.
 JTHX - Thomas D. Hicks, Citicorp Railmark, Inc.
 JTIX - Joseph Transportation, Inc.
 JTJX - Joseph Transportation, Inc.
 JTLX - Joseph Resources, Inc.
 JTMX - ISG Resources, Inc.
 JTPX - Joseph Transportation, Inc.
 JTSX - Joseph Transportation, Inc.
 JTSZ - Jontri Transportation Company
 JTTX - Trailer Train Company, TTX Company
 JUGU - Jogolinja
 JVRR - Juniata Valley Railroad
 JWAX - GE Rail Services Corporation
 JWFX - J. W. Flammer Company, Inc.
 JWRX - Jim Walter Resources, Inc., Alabama Power Company

J